This list of giant squid specimens and sightings from the 20th century is a comprehensive timeline of human encounters with members of the genus Architeuthis, popularly known as giant squid. It includes animals that were caught by fishermen, found washed ashore, recovered (in whole or in part) from sperm whales and other predatory species, as well as those reliably sighted at sea. The list also covers specimens incorrectly assigned to the genus Architeuthis in original descriptions or later publications.

Background 

The frequency of documented giant squid encounters greatly increased throughout the 20th century, providing much insight into the species's biology and life history. It was found that giant squid are preyed upon not only by sperm whales but by a wide range of other animals, including albacore (#193), lancetfish (#149 and 164; see #48 for 19th century record), swordfish (#232), blue sharks (#215 and 375), Portuguese dogfish (#203), shortfin mako sharks (#205 and 431), sleeper sharks (#396, 405, 430, 432, and 433), and northern elephant seals (#279 and 332). One specimen taken alive by troll was reportedly attacked by a false killer whale during retrieval (#247).

Observations of live and freshly dead animals also revealed new aspects of giant squid behaviour, including rapid colour change (#391) and high-speed swimming at the surface (#106), though the veracity of the latter observation has been questioned. Additionally, examinations of dead specimens and partial remains provided data on diet (#226 and 412), longevity and habitat (#369, 371, and 374), depth of occurrence and buoyancy (#246 and 266), metabolism and locomotory ability (#411), as well as tentacle regeneration and internal parasites (#169). New preservation methods, including plastination (#429), were also trialled.

The large-scale commercial exploitation of sperm whales, particularly from the end of World War II to the 1970s, provided a rich source of giant squid remains for scientific study. The vast majority of these consisted of disarticulated beaks (with up to 47 found in a single sperm whale stomach; #331), though more substantial remains were occasionally recovered, including even whole adult specimens (#84, 128, 137, 151, 209, 225, and 234), with one reportedly showing signs of life after being vomited (#128). The most important figure in the study of ingested giant squid remains was marine biologist Malcolm Clarke, who authored around a dozen relevant papers.

Following the flurry of new giant squid species descriptions that characterised the latter half of the 19th century, the 20th century saw only three newly erected species: Architeuthis japonica by Pfeffer (1912:27), based on a specimen caught in Tokyo Bay in 1895 (#67); Architeuthis clarkei by Robson (1933), based on a carcass that washed ashore in Scarborough, England, earlier that year (#107); and Architeuthis nawaji by Cadenat (1935), based on a specimen caught in the Bay of Biscay the same year (#110). The consensus today is that there exists only a single, globally distributed species of giant squid: Architeuthis dux.

The second half of the 20th century saw the first serious efforts to photograph or film a live giant squid. Beginning in the late 1980s, most of these early attempts were led by either Frederick Aldrich or Clyde Roper, the two foremost giant squid experts of their time. However, it would not be until the first years of the 21st century that this milestone was finally achieved.

List of giant squid 

 Misidentification (non-architeuthid)  Record encompassing multiple specimens  Photographed or filmed while alive

Specimen images 
The following images relate to 20th century giant squid specimens and sightings. The number below each image corresponds to that given in the List of giant squid table and is linked to the relevant record therein. The date on which the specimen was first documented is also given (the little-endian day/month/year date format is used throughout).

Notes

References

Short citations

Full citations

A

B

C

D

E

F

G

H

I

J

K

L

M

N

O

P

R

S

T

V

W

Y

Z

Author unknown 

 
 
 
 
 
 
 
 
 
 
 
 
 
  
 
 
 
  
 
  
  
 
 
 
 
  
 
 
 

Giant squid
Lists of animal specimens
20th century-related lists